Siliguri Junction (station code:- SGUJ)  is one of the major and second largest railway station that serve the city of Siliguri  located in Darjeeling district in the Indian state of West Bengal. The Station has two types of gauges visible i.e.  broad gauge, &  narrow-gauge tracks for Darjeeling Himalayan Railway. It was opened in 1949. It formerly had the distinction of having three gauges visible but the metre-gauge line from Aluabari Road to Siliguri Junction was converted later into broad gauge few years ago the trains used to run between Siliguri Junction to Naksalbari by the metre-gauge line. Siliguri Junction lies on three railway lines New Jalpaiguri–Alipurduar–Samuktala Road line, Katihar–Siliguri line and Darjeeling Himalayan Railway Line. This railway station also has its own locomotive shed i.e Diesel Loco Shed, Siliguri

History

With the railway routes badly disturbed by the partition of India in 1947, Siliguri Town railway station suddenly lost its preeminence as the broad-gauge link to Calcutta running across East Pakistan. With three metre-gauge lines, the new Siliguri Junction railway station became the main railway station in the area. The three metre-gauge lines were linked to Kishanganj and Barsoi, Assam and Haldibari. The narrow gauge Darjeeling Himalayan Railway was there. The short reign was over in the 1960s when a new broad-gauge line linked Siliguri with Calcutta, and subsequently, all railway lines in the area (excepting Darjeeling Himalayan Railway) were converted to broad gauge. The focus shifted in 1960 to a brand new broad-gauge station at New Jalpaiguri.

Amenities
Amenities at Siliguri Junction include: Waiting room, Retiring room, Tourist Information Centre, Book stalls and some variety stores. Tenzing Norgay central bus terminal and SNT Siliguri bus stand are located just outside this railway station and West Bengal Tourism Office is also located nearby.

Distance from Siliguri Junction: Bagdogra Airport , New Jalpaiguri railway station , Darjeeling , Gangtok , Rangpo , Kurseong , Pakyong Airport , Kalimpong , Thimphu , Nathula , Kakarbhitta , Phuntsholing .

City transportation

Buses 
The North Bengal State Transport Corporation operates bus services from Siliguri Junction railway station to Siliguri city and suburban areas, Also private buses runs between all over the city from Siliguri Junction railway station. The Tenzing Norgay Central Bus Terminus and SNT Siliguri Bus Terminus are just opposite to each other besides  Siliguri junction railway station, so long-route buses are available from these terminus.

Cars 
Siliguri junction railway station is located in the middle of the Siliguri city, so it is very easy to reach the railway station.

Ride aggregator services Uber, Rapido, Ola provide rides from the train station to various parts of the city. One can also book private cabs to go Darjeeling, Gangtok and all over hill areas. Apart from these numerous private taxi operators provide pre-paid and post-paid taxi services to the city. E-rickshaw, City auto facilities are available in the station.

Diesel loco shed

Diesel Loco Shed, Siliguri was established at Siliguri in 1961 and a new broad-gauge diesel loco shed was established in 2007. WDP 4 and WDG 4 locos were transferred from Hubli. It is home to the WDP-4 loco "Baaz". Nowadays it is also holds WDP 4B, WDP 4D & WDG 4D locomotives.

See Also
Siliguri Town railway station
New Jalpaiguri Junction railway station

References

External links

 Railway stations in Siliguri
Katihar railway division
Railway stations in Darjeeling district
Railway stations opened in 1949
Railway junction stations in West Bengal
Transport in Siliguri